The 1952–53 Allsvenskan was the 19th season of the top division of Swedish handball. It was the first season where the title of Swedish Champions was awarded to the winner of the league, with Svenska mästerskapet being discontinued after the previous season. 10 teams competed in the league. IFK Kristianstad won the league and claimed their fourth Swedish title. Karlstads BIK and Näsby IF were relegated.

League table

References 

Swedish handball competitions